Fellowship of the Royal Society of Chemistry (FRSC) is an award conferred by the Royal Society of Chemistry (RSC) in the United Kingdom.

FRSC award
Achieving Fellow status in the chemical profession denotes to the wider community a high level of accomplishment as a professional chemist. Eligibility for Fellow status applies to applicants who are Members of the Royal Society of Chemistry (MRSC), with a minimum of 5 years professional experience. In addition, they must have made an outstanding contribution to the advancement of the chemical sciences; or to the advancement of the chemical sciences as a profession; or have been distinguished in the management of a chemical sciences organization.

In all cases FRSC sponsor references are required. The award of designatory letters FRSC  is subject to the final approval of the RSC Applications Committee.  In addition to the above, all RSC membership requires acceptance and adherence to a specific code of conduct and an established set of high standards of ethical and professional behavior. 
The RSC continuously establishes, and evaluates professional qualifications and the awarding of its designatory letters and awards. See Category:Fellows of the Royal Society of Chemistry for examples of fellows.

Honorary Fellowship of the Society ("HonFRSC") is awarded for distinguished service in the field of chemistry.

References

Chemistry education
Professional certification in science
Royal Society of Chemistry

Royal Society of Chemistry